Allen Springs is a rural unincorporated community in northwest Allen County, Kentucky, United States. The community is located near the terminus of Kentucky Route 240 at US Route 231.

References

Unincorporated communities in Allen County, Kentucky
Unincorporated communities in Kentucky